Dragon Quest: The Adventure of Dai is a manga series written by Riku Sanjo and illustrated by Koji Inada. A short story  was first released in the 25th and 26th issues of Weekly Shōnen Jump in 1989. Issues 35–37 included the short story . The serialization of The Adventure of Dai began that same year in the 45th issue of Weekly Shōnen Jump, published on October 23. It continued on for seven years before ending in the 52nd issue of Weekly Shōnen Jump on December 9, 1996. The manga was collected into 37 tankōbon volumes published between March 9, 1990 and June 4, 1997. It was later released in 22 bunkobon volumes published from June 18, 2003 to March 18, 2004. A 25-volume edition that includes the color pages from its original magazine run and newly drawn covers by Inada was published between October 2, 2020 and July 2, 2021.

A prequel manga series illustrated by Yūsaku Shibata, with Sanjo credited for original work, began serializing in Shueisha's V Jump manga magazine in the November issue on September 19, 2020. The series is centered around Avan before he met Dai and his companions.

A spin-off manga written and illustrated by Yoshikazu Amami, titled Dragon Quest: The Adventure of Dai - Cross Blade, launched in the November issue of Shueisha's Saikyō Jump manga magazine on October 1, 2020.

On July 9, 2021, Viz Media announced they licensed the series for English publication, starting on March 1, 2022.



Volume list

Original release

2020 re-release

Yūsha Avan to Gokuen no Maō

Cross Blade

References

Dragon Quest
Dragon Quest